Tylerichthys is an extinct genus of prehistoric surgeonfish that lived in a coral reef during the Lutetian epoch of what is now Monte Bolca, Italy.

See also

 Prehistoric fish
 List of prehistoric bony fish

References

Eocene fish
Acanthuridae
Fossils of Italy
Prehistoric ray-finned fish genera
Fossil taxa described in 1981